Moe railway station is located on the Gippsland line in Victoria, Australia. It serves the town of Moe, and it opened on 1 March 1878.

It was formerly the junction station for the narrow gauge Walhalla line and the broad gauge Thorpdale and Yallourn lines.

In 1955, electrification was extended to the station and Yallourn from Warragul, and the following year, it was extended to Traralgon.

A 70 ft. turntable also existed at Moe until 1963, when it was dismantled. In 1964, siding "B" at the station was abolished. In 1966, the electric staff signalling was abolished between Moe and Morwell, and was replaced with Automatic and Track Control.

By 1987, the line to Yallourn was closed. In 1989, the signal box, interlocking, signals and goods yard was abolished.

Construction of the current station building commenced in late 1991, and was completed in 1992, with the former station building demolished shortly after.

Platforms and services

Moe has one platform. It is serviced by V/Line Traralgon and Bairnsdale line services.

Platform 1:
 services to Traralgon, Bairnsdale and Southern Cross

Transport links

Latrobe Valley Bus Lines operates eight routes via Moe station, under contract to Public Transport Victoria:
: Moe – Traralgon
: Moe – Traralgon
: to Traralgon
: Moe – Moe West
: Moe – Moe South
: Moe – Moe North
: Moe – Newborough
: Moe – Newborough

Warragul Bus Lines operates two routes via Moe station, under contract to Public Transport Victoria:
Garfield station – Traralgon Plaza
Traralgon station – Drouin North

References

External links

Victorian Railway Stations Gallery
Melway map

Railway stations in Australia opened in 1878
Regional railway stations in Victoria (Australia)
Walhalla railway line
Transport in Gippsland (region)
City of Latrobe